Currituck County High School is a public high school located in Barco, North Carolina. It serves all of Currituck County including Knotts Island and Corolla.

History
Currituck County High School opened for the 1976–77 school year, replacing J.P. Knapp High School which simultaneously became a junior high school.

The current high school building opened for the 1998–99 school year and is located next door to the original 1976 building which is now Currituck County Middle School.

Athletics
Currituck County High School athletics teams compete in the Northeastern Coastal Conference. Currituck County's colors are red, black, and white and their mascot is the knight. Currituck County offers the following sports programs:

State championships 

 Boys basketball
 1986 1A NCHSAA State Champions, won the first high school basketball played in the Dean E. Smith Center at the University of North Carolina - Chapel Hill
 Softball
 1991 1A NCHSAA State Champions
 1993 1A NCHSAA State Champions
 Girls volleyball
 2018 2A NCHSAA State Champions
 Cheerleading
 2019 NCHSAA State Champions

References

External links

Public high schools in North Carolina
Education in Currituck County, North Carolina
1976 establishments in North Carolina
Educational institutions established in 1976